Expedition Robinson: VIP, was the first celebrity version of Expedition Robinson, or Survivor as it is referred to in some countries, to air in Scandinavia and it aired in 2005. This was also one of the first editions of Expedition Robinson in which more than one country participated as Denmark, Norway, and Sweden were each represented by five of the fifteen celebrities who took part. As part of the multi-country twist this season the contestants were divided into tribes based on their countries of origin. As each country had to be represented in the final, the last remaining member of each tribe would automatically advance to the final and, depending on when they became the last member of their tribe, would be given immunity from all remaining eliminations. When it came time to vote for a winner all eliminated contestants were given the option to vote between the two finalists from the other countries' tribes. Eventually Swedish celebrity Tilde Fröling won the season by a jury vote of 5-4-3 over Norwegian celebrity Jan Simonsen and Danish celebrity Asbjørn Riis.

Finishing order

Episode Guide

Voting history

External links
 http://www.dagbladet.no/kultur/2004/07/25/403807.html

DNK
2005 television series debuts
2005 television series endings